Saratovka (Harıtaw) is a rural locality (a village) in Maximovksky Selsoviet, Sterlitamaksky District, Bashkortostan, Russia. The population was 148 as of 2010. There is 1 street.

Geography 
Saratovka is located 49 km west of Sterlitamak (the district's administrative centre) by road. Maximovka is the nearest rural locality.

References 

Rural localities in Sterlitamaksky District